David W. Leebron (born February 12, 1955) is an American attorney and legal scholar who served as the 7th President of Rice University from 2004 to 2022. He was a professor and dean of Columbia Law School, until he was named president of Rice University on July 1, 2004.

Early life and education
Born to Carol Leebron and Norman Leebron in 1955 on February 12, David Leebron was raised Jewish in Philadelphia, Pennsylvania. An Eagle Scout, Leebron was influenced by a steady stream of exchange students in his house—from Europe, Japan and Mexico—to develop an interest in international affairs. He later traveled to Germany as an exchange student himself and speaks German.

Leebron earned a Bachelors, summa cum laude, in History and Science from Harvard College in 1976, and his JD, magna cum laude, from Harvard Law School in 1979, where he was president of the Harvard Law Review, notably working with the future Supreme Court Chief Justice John Roberts.

Career

Early career 
After graduating from Harvard Law, Leebron clerked for Judge Shirley Hufstedler in Los Angeles at the U.S. Ninth Circuit Court of Appeals. He taught as a professor at the UCLA School of Law for a semester. Leebron then entered private practice from 1981 to 1983 as an associate at the New York firm Cleary, Gottlieb, Steen & Hamilton. He then re-entered academia as a law professor at New York University and the director of NYU's International Legal Studies Program from 1983 to 1989. In 1989 he joined the faculty at Columbia Law School, where he became dean in 1996. He became President of Rice University in 2004. As a professor, he taught and published in areas of corporate finance, international economic law, human rights, privacy and torts. He was also a co-author of a textbook on human rights, though most recently has written about problems in international trade law.
He is member of the New York State Bar and, currently inactive, the Hawaii and Pennsylvania bars. He is on the American Law Deans Association Board of Directors. He has served on the Association of American Law Schools Committee on Nominations. He is also a member of the American Law Institute (ex officio), the Council on Foreign Relations, the American Society of International Law, the board of directors of the IMAX Corporation and the editorial board of Foundation Press.

Columbia Law School
As Dean of Columbia Law School, Leebron approximately doubled the annual giving and the school's endowment, enhancing financial aid and support for students who enter public service. He was known for recruiting promising junior faculty.

Rice University
Leebron became the 7th President of Rice University on the first of June in 2004.

Under Leebron’s leadership, the campus has added two new residential colleges; the 10-story BioScience Research Collaborative, where scientists and educators from Rice and other Texas Medical Center institutions work together; a new recreation and wellness center; an additional food servery; a central campus pavilion that serves as a meeting and study place; an updated sports arena; a new physics building; and the Public Art Program, a presidential initiative that has added art across campus, although the University suffered a disappointing setback when merger talks between Baylor College of Medicine and Rice stalled.

As president, Leebron has pushed the creation of a vision for the University, called the Vision for the Second Century. Leebron set forth a plan for expansion, calling for opinions from the Rice community. The vision calls for expanding the undergraduate body to around 3800, adding two more residential colleges and expanding the current ones. The new students would mostly come from outside Texas, while the number of students from Texas would hold steady at around 1300 students.

In November 2008, Leebron traveled to Iran as part of an academic tour sponsored by the Association of American Universities. On this four-day tour, he visited Sharif University, Iran's top engineering school, where he took part in an open question and answer session with Iranian students. Leebron compared his visit to the opening of relations with China during the 1970s.

On May 26, 2021, Leebron announced that he would resign as President of Rice effective June 30, 2022.

Personal life 
Leebron married Y. Ping Sun in 1990. Leebron and Sun have two children, Daniel and Mei.

References

1956 births
20th-century American Jews
Educators from Philadelphia
Harvard Law School alumni
Deans of Columbia Law School
New York University faculty
Presidents of Rice University
Deans of law schools in the United States
Living people
William Penn Charter School alumni
People associated with Cleary Gottlieb Steen & Hamilton
Harvard College alumni
21st-century American Jews